The November 2008 Carolinas tornado outbreak was a brief but deadly tornado outbreak which began shortly after midnight (local time), while many people were sleeping. Most of the eight tornadoes that touched down were produced by two supercell thunderstorms over North Carolina. At 12:25 a.m. EST, the National Weather Service issued a tornado watch for most of eastern North Carolina as the risk of tornadoes increased. Not long after, the first tornado of the outbreak, an EF2, touched down in South Carolina. Almost an hour later, the second tornado touched down in Robeson County, North Carolina. Three other minor tornadoes, two EF0 and an EF1, touched down over the next two hours. Around 3:10 a.m. EST, the first of two killer tornadoes touched down near Kenly, North Carolina. The EF2 tornado destroyed a few homes and damaged several others. Roughly 20 minutes later, an EF3 tornado touched down in Wilson County. This tornado killed one person and injured a few others after destroying several homes. Total damages from the outbreak amounted to $2.5 million, about half of which was a result of the EF3 tornado.

Synopsis

On November 14, the National Weather Service issued a slight risk of severe weather for the early hours of November 15 for the Carolinas and northern Gulf coast. Although conditions were not favorable for a large-scale severe weather event, the possibility of small clusters of thunderstorms existed. Strong wind shear was forecast to persist, which would allow small bow-echo line of thunderstorms which could produce damaging winds. The result of a weak disturbance which passed through the area of slight risk lowered the chances of tornadic thunderstorms developing. At 12:25 a.m. EST, the Storm Prediction Center (SPC) issued a Tornado watch for most of eastern North Carolina. A broken line of thunderstorms had already developed and the risk of tornadoes greatly increased, with the chances of an EF2 or stronger touching down reaching 20%. The first tornado touched down shortly after in South Carolina. Over the following several hours, two supercell thunderstorms spawned seven more tornadoes throughout North Carolina. The final tornado dissipated around 4:36 a.m. EST, just 3 hours and 46 minutes after the outbreak started. The tornado watch remained in effect until before being cancelled at 8:00 a.m. EST.

Confirmed tornadoes

The first tornado of the outbreak touched down around 12:50 a.m. Large pine trees were snapped and a mobile home was rolled about 20 yards (18.2 m) before being completely destroyed. A truck was also flipped outside a church parking lot before the tornado lifted. However, several minutes later it touched down again, destroying the roof and severely damaging the walls of a brick home. After traveling for about one third of a mile, the tornado destroyed the roof of another brick home. In all, the tornado damaged 25 structures and destroyed seven others. Three cars were also damaged and another three were destroyed along the tornado's  path. No injuries were reported as a result of the tornado and damages amounted to $325,000.

Around 1:35 a.m. Afterwards, the tornado traveled towards the north-northeast and crossed NC 20. An auto repair shop located along the highway sustained significant damage with all of the bay windows being blown out and 17 nearby storage sheds were destroyed. Several trees were knocked down onto railroad tracks before the tornado damaged another mobile home and dissipated. No injuries were reported as a result of the tornado and damages amounted to $50,000. The third tornado touched down around 2:15 a.m. EST near the town of Autryville in Sampson County. Several trees were damaged along the tornado's path and one home sustained notable damage. A carport near the home was blown down and twisted into nearby trees. No injuries were reported as a result of the tornado and damages amounted to $25,000. The tornado was rated as an EF0 by the National Weather Service.

The fourth tornado of the outbreak touched down around 2:45 a.m. EST near Peacocks Crossroads in Johnston County, knocking down several trees, some of which were mature. Significant roof damage occurred after the tornado struck a double-wide mobile home and destroyed the porch of another home. Another mobile home had some of its siding torn off before the tornado dissipated. No injuries were reported as a result of the tornado and damages amounted to $30,000. The tornado was rated as an EF1 by the National Weather Service. The fifth tornado of the outbreak touched down around 3:03 a.m. EST near US 70, damaging several pine trees and causing minor roof damage. Tracking towards the northeast, the tornado destroyed a carport and the car inside. A trailer was rolled on its side and a nearby home sustained siding and shingle damage. Afterwards, the tornado struck a horse farm where it destroyed a small barn and damaged a stable. Before dissipating, the tornado blew out the windows in the garage of one home. No injuries were reported as a result of the tornado and damages amounted to $75,000. The tornado was rated as a high-end EF0 by the National Weather Service.

The sixth and first killer tornado of the outbreak touched down around 3:10 a.m. EST and snapped several trees. After traveling for three quarters of a mile, it produced significant structural damage along NC 222 where a brick home was destroyed. A nearby trailer was rolled 30 ft down the driveway of the home. The four residents sustained no injuries despite having not taken shelter before the tornado. A double-wide mobile home was blown off its foundation and flipped for 50 ft before falling to the ground. One of the occupants, a 61-year-old woman was killed and her husband sustained major injuries. Three other mobile homes were destroyed by the tornado before it crossed into Wilson County. Once in Wilson County, several more mobile homes sustained significant damage before the tornado lifted. Damages from the tornado in both counties amounted to $700,000. The tornado was rated as an EF2 by the National Weather Service.

The most significant tornado during the outbreak touched down around 3:30 a.m. EST near Harrison Drive where a tree was snapped. Traveling towards the northeast, the tornado blew a home off its foundation and completely destroyed it near Route 1330. Local firefighters and rescue responders estimated that the home rolled four times before being destroyed. At the time the tornado struck, three people were in the home, one of which was killed. After destroying the home, the tornado caused major damage to the upper portion of another home and tore off the roof of another. Afterwards, the tornado tracked into Elm City where numerous trees were damaged and a porch was blown off a home. An estimated 8,000 residents in Wilson County were left without power following the tornado. Four other people were injured as a result of the tornado and damages amounted to $1.2 million. About 100 people were also displaced due to the tornado. The tornado was rated as a low-end EF3 along its discontinuous  track.

The final tornado of the outbreak touched down near US 64 around 4:30 a.m. EST. The tornado traveled towards the northeast, damaging two mobile homes and a chapel. Several outbuildings were also damaged or destroyed near a farm before the tornado dissipated. The tornado was rated as an EF1 along its  track. No injuries were reported as a result of the tornado and damages amounted to $50,000.

Aftermath
The estimated cost to clean up debris from the two killer tornadoes was estimated at $500,000. The governor of Wilson County requested that the areas struck by the EF3 tornado and the EF2 prior as disaster areas to allow federal assistance. In Kenly, hospital staff raised about $300 to help a family whose home was completely destroyed. Up to 125 personnel were deployed to check on residents who were still at home and to assist those in need. Several volunteers helped remove trees and debris off roads to make way for aid. Two Red Cross teams set up a shelter at the Kenly Free Will Baptist Church. During church ceremonies, volunteers organized outside the church to feed residents who lost their homes. A Methodist church group from Virginia arrived in Johnston and Wilson counties the day after the tornadoes to assist with cleanup efforts. A fund was set up for the 11-year-old boy, Joshua Wiggens, who was killed by the Elm City tornado. By November 17, the Red Cross funds were depleted funds needed to keep the organization out of debt were $38 million below what was required. About $20,000 was spent in the charity effort in Kenly and the governor of Wilson County urged residents who were no affected by the storm to send donations to the Red Cross. The lack of funding for the Red Cross prompted the governor to allow up to $28,000 in the state's emergency funds to be used for assistance by the Red Cross. On November 21, low-interest loans were approved for residents in the affected counties. Homeowners in Johnston, Franklin, Harnett, Nash, Sampson, Wake, Wayne and Wilson counties were able to apply for loans up to $200,000 to repair storm damage and businesses were allowed to apply for loans up to $2 million. On November 24, an unknown member of the 82nd Airborne Division donated 50 cases of non-perishable food and water to assist victims of the tornado. The relief goods were dropped off at the J.S. Waters School in Goldston without notice.

See also
List of North American tornadoes and tornado outbreaks

References

Tornadoes in North Carolina
Tornadoes in South Carolina
F3 tornadoes
November 2008 events in the United States
Tornadoes of 2008
2008 natural disasters in the United States
2008 in North Carolina
2008 in South Carolina